David Bernard is an American orchestral conductor.

David Bernard has conducted in the United States and in over 20 countries. He serves as Music Director of the Park Avenue Chamber Symphony and the Massapequa Philharmonic. A multiple First Prize winner of the Orchestral Conducting Competition of The American Prize, Bernard was described in the judges’ remarks as “a first-rate conductor…phenomenal performance…masterly in shaping, phrasing, technique and expressively.”  Lucid Culture praised Bernard’s recent Lincoln Center performance of Stravinsky’s “The Rite of Spring”: “Conducting from memory, David Bernard led a transcendent performance. Segues were seamless, contrasts were vivid and Stravinsky’s whirling exchanges of voices were expertly choreographed.”  Bernard’s complete recorded Beethoven symphony cycle was praised by Fanfare magazine for its “intensity, spontaneity, propulsive rhythm, textural clarity, dynamic control, and well-judged phrasing”. His premiere recording of a new edition of Stravinsky’s '"The Rite of Spring" was praised by Gramophone as “committed and forceful…(with) thrilling moments”.

Bernard has worked with Clinton F. Nieweg, retired librarian of the Philadelphia Orchestra, on editing new editions of Stravinsky’s “The Rite of Spring” and “The Firebird Suite—1919 Version”, which has been published by Edwin F. Kalmus in 2016.  In addition, he has published his own editions of Mozart’s Clarinet Concerto, K. 622, and Schumann’s Symphony No. 2, Op. 61.

Bernard has appeared as a guest conductor with orchestras including the Brooklyn Symphony, the Greater Newburgh Symphony Orchestra, the Litha Symphony, Manhattan School of Music, the Massapequa Philharmonic, the New York Symphonic Arts Ensemble, the Putnam Symphony and the South Shore Symphony. He has presented world premières of scores by Bruce Adolphe, Chris Caswell, John Mackey, Ted Rosenthal, Jake Runestad, and distinguished concert collaborators have included Anna Lee, Jeffrey Biegel, Carter Brey, David Chan, Catherine Cho, Adrian Daurov, Pedro Díaz, Edith Dowd, Stanley Drucker, Bart Feller, Ryu Goto, Whoopi Goldberg, Sirena Huang, Judith Ingolfsson, Yevgeny Kutik, Anna Lee, Jessica Lee, Kristin Lee, Jon Manasse, Anthony McGill, Spencer Myer, Todd Phillips, Kristin Sampson and Cameron Schutza.

Bernard’s approach to growing new audiences for classical music include engaging families in the community through schools, presenting multimedia concert presentations and developing a new concert format—“Classical Music from the Inside Out” where audiences sit inside the orchestra during concerts. Bernard’s Inside Out concerts with the Park Avenue Chamber Symphony and the Massapequa Philharmonic have been acclaimed by WQXR, Newsday, Classical World and the Epoch Times.

External links
Bernard's Website: Maestro Bernard
Biography: David Bernard, from Park Avenue Chamber Symphony
Discography: David Bernard, from Apple Music - iTunes

American male conductors (music)
Jewish classical musicians
1964 births
Living people
21st-century American conductors (music)
21st-century American male musicians